Richard A. Smith is an American politician. He was member of the Connecticut House of Representatives from the 108th district, serving from 2011 to January 6, 2021. Smith has sponsored 88 bills. He is a member of the Republican party.

References

Living people
Republican Party members of the Connecticut House of Representatives
21st-century American politicians
Year of birth missing (living people)